Anne Marit Korsvold (born 30 April 1966) is a Norwegian ski-orienteering competitor. 

She won a bronze medal in the relay at the World Ski Orienteering Championships in Pontarlier in 1992, together with Kristine Ødegaard and Hilde Gjermundshaug Pedersen. She won a silver medal in the relay at the World Championships in Val di Non in 1994, together with Valborg Madslien and Hilde Gjermundshaug Pedersen.

References

1966 births
Living people
Norwegian orienteers
Female orienteers
Ski-orienteers
20th-century Norwegian women